Eocarcinoidea is a superfamily of fossil decapod crustaceans. Formerly thought to be the earliest true crabs, they are now thought to be the oldest members of the Anomura. Two species are included, each in its own family-taxon: Eocarcinus praecursor (Eocarcinidae) and Platykotta akaina (Platykottidae).

References

Anomura